The Roman Catholic Diocese of Suchitepéquez-Retalhuleu (erected 31 December 1996) is a suffragan diocese of the Archdiocese of Los Altos Quetzaltenango-Totonicapán.

Ordinaries
Pablo Vizcaino Prado (1996– )

External links and references

Suchitepequez-Retalhuleu
Suchitepequez-Retalhuleu
Suchitepequez-Retalhuleu
Roman Catholic Ecclesiastical Province of Los Altos Quetzaltenango-Totonicapán